Olympia High School (OHS), commonly referred to as Oly, is a public high school in the southeast part of Olympia, Washington along the city's border with Tumwater. It is the oldest of two comprehensive high schools in the Olympia School District, and also one of the oldest public secondary schools in the state of Washington.

History

Olympia High School opened in 1849 as additional public schooling beyond 1-8 curriculum, and graduated its first class in 1849. OHS shared a few locations with elementary schools before having its own building in 1907, when OHS became officially named William Winlock Miller School, a high school. The 1907 building was built on a square block donated by the widow of pioneer leader William Winlock Miller on ground immediately east of the today's sunken gardens, part of the Washington State Capitol Campus.  That building burned in 1918, its Tenino sandstone was salvaged in 1920 to construct the face of the Power House on Capitol Lake, used to heat Washington's permanent capitol campus that proceeded in construction.

The next structure for W.W. Miller High School was built in 1919 between 12th and 13th Streets on Capitol Way because the state had purchased the land near the sunken garden to increase the Capitol grounds. An auditorium, gymnasium, and more classrooms were added to that building in 1926; however, any further expansion on this site was impossible. As the school's capacity needed increasing,  between Carlyon Avenue and North Street were purchased.

Until 1955, Oly drew students from all of Thurston County, Washington, except its most southern reaches.  But Oly's catchment area split in 1955 with the creation North Thurston High School, then split again in 1961 as Tumwater High School opened, then once again with the spawning of Capital High School in 1975.  Today's location of OHS opened in 1961, and underwent a full renovation, completed in the summer of 2000 that enclosed the 9 separate buildings of the 1961 design.

Sports
Olympia High School is a 4A-division member of the Washington Interscholastic Activities Association.
Olympia High School is known for their athletics teams consistently placing in the top 10 for the 4A classification.

State Championships, second place:

Boys' Basketball - 1987, 1998; Girls' Golf - 1997; Girls' Gymnastics - 1998; Girls' Soccer - 1988, 1995; Boys' Swimming - 1958, 1970, 1972; Girls' Swimming - 1989, 1995; Boys' Tennis - 1979, 1982, 1990, 2007; Girls' Tennis - 1982, 1999; Girls' Volleyball - 1981; Baseball  - 2019; Girls' Bowling - 2022

Notable alumni
 General Muir S. Fairchild, 1913, Vice Chief of Staff for USAF, first Academy commander, key air war strategist in World War II, World War I Flyboy
 Eric Alexander, 1986, Jazz musician
 Gerry L. Alexander, 1954, Chief Justice, Washington State Supreme Court
 Floyd Brown, 1980, author, speaker and media commentator
 Adam Conley, 2008, current MLB player (Miami Marlins)
 Gretchen Christopher, 1958, singer, The Fleetwoods
 Bruce P. Crandall, 1951, Lieutenant Colonel, United States Army (Ret.) (Medal of Honor Receipiant)(helicopter pilot, call sign "Snake", in movie We Were Soldiers)
 Daniella Deutscher, 1994, actress
 Barbara Ellis, 1958, singer, The Fleetwoods
 Ira Flagstead, 1911(?), former MLB player (Detroit Tigers, Boston Braves, Washington Senators, Pittsburgh Pirates)
 Rickie Lee Jones, 1974, singer, songwriter, producer
 Kathleen Hays, 1970, financial reporter on the Bloomberg TV network
 Douglas Massey, 1970, professor of sociology and former president (2000–01) of the American Sociological Association
 Bill Moos 1969, Director of Athletics at the University of Nebraska
 Moon Mullen, 1935(?) former MLB player (Philadelphia Phillies)
 Joy Osmanski, 1993, actress, television series The Loop and It's Always Sunny in Philadelphia
 Don Rich, 1959, guitarist/fiddler/band leader for Buck Owens and the Buckaroos
 Travis Shook, 1986, jazz musician
 Irene Stewart, 1975, Seattle School Board member
 Gary Troxel, 1958, singer, The Fleetwoods
 Bud Ward, 1932, two-time winner of the US Amateur Golf Championship (1939, 1941)

References

External links

School website
School District

High schools in Thurston County, Washington
History of Olympia, Washington
Schools in Olympia, Washington
Public high schools in Washington (state)
1882 establishments in the United States